Nykøbing Strandhuse is a coastal village and summer house development located  south of Marielyst and  southeast of Væggerløse on the Danish island of Falster. As of 2022, it has a population of 326.

References

Falster
Cities and towns in Region Zealand
Guldborgsund Municipality